Ben Chipman is an American Democratic politician from Maine. He is a member of the Maine Senate representing District 27, comprising part of Portland, Maine. Chipman served in the Maine House of Representatives from December 2010 until December 2016 as an independent, and since December 2016 he has served as a member of the Maine Senate as a Democrat.

Early life and education
Chipman earned a degree in liberal arts from the University of Maine in 1997. His professional experience includes working as a community organizer and as a legislative aide, and as of 2018 he was working as an independent notary for real estate closings.

Political career
Chipman worked as an aide in the Office of the Clerk at the Maine State House beginning in 2002. From 2009-2010, he served on Portland's Charter Commission, which was tasked with rewriting the city's charter, and from 2002-2006 he was a legislative aide to John Eder. Chipman was a founding member of the Portland Green Independent Committee.

Maine House
Chipman first ran for Maine House District 119, representing Portland's Parkside, Bayside, and East Bayside neighborhoods, in 2010. Throughout his first term, he was the only independent in the Maine House of Representatives.

In 2012, Chipman faced Herb Adams (politician), who had held the District 119 seat until 2010. He was re-elected with 54% of the vote, defeating Adams and Republican Gwen Tuttle. He was joined by fellow unenrolled lawmakers Jeffrey Evangelos, Joseph E. Brooks and James J. Campbell in the Maine House.

In January 2013, Chipman, Brooks and Evangelos met with Governor Paul LePage to discuss balancing the state budget. During the meeting, LePage grew agitated, used profanity and abruptly exited.

Chipman was re-elected to the Maine House in 2014, receiving nearly 60% of the vote in a three-way race.

On September 4, 2015, Chipman announced that he was joining the Democratic Party. He stated that one of his priorities was to hold LePage accountable for his behavior, and by joining the majority party in the Maine House of Representatives, Chipman would be in a better position to accomplish that goal. He was one of three members of the Maine House who requested an investigation of LePage for using $530,000 of taxpayer funds to pressure a private school into firing their new president, a political rival of the Governor. The state's Government Oversight Committee unanimously voted to launch the investigation, and Chipman led an effort to impeach LePage. In January 2016, Republican House Speaker Ken Fredette's motion to preempt the impeachment was debated and the debate was tabled indefinitely.

Maine Senate
After a contentious Democratic primary in 2016,, Chipman won 53% of the vote in the Maine Senate District 27 three-way general election, and he was re-elected in 2018, 2020 and finally 2022.

In April 2021, Chipman introduced LD #1123, "An Act To Authorize a Memorial to the Victims of COVID-19" authorizing the Capitol Park Commission to erect a monument to honor Maine victims of the COVID-19 pandemic.

Personal life
Chipman was a 2021 board member of Amistad Peer Support and Recovery, a Portland nonprofit. He lives with his partner, City Councilor and former MGIP chairperson Anna Trevorrow.

Electoral results

Maine House

Maine Senate

References

External links
Official Website
Questionnaire The League of Young Voters
Ballotpedia: Benjamin Chipman
Ben Chipman on Twitter
A Conversation with Ben Chipman: Independent Political Report

Living people
Maine Greens
Politicians from Portland, Maine
Members of the Maine House of Representatives
Maine Independents
University of Maine alumni
Politicians from Brunswick, Maine
21st-century American politicians
Maine Democrats
Year of birth missing (living people)
Maine state senators